Kala Keerthi Sumana Jayatillake (born April 23, 1937) is a popular Sinhala broadcaster who produced and hosted children's programmes at SLBC, including Handa Mama. She is married to K. Jayatillake.

Sources

External links 
 Sri Lanka Broadcasting Corporation

Sri Lankan radio personalities
1937 births
Living people
Kala Keerthi